Nemia Kenatale (born 21 January 1986) is a Fijian rugby union player. He plays in the scrumhalf position. He formerly played for Glasgow Warriors in the Pro12.

Rugby Union career

Amateur career

While not in use for the Warriors, Kenatale played for Stirling County.

Professional career

On 31 May 2016 it was announced that Nemia had signed for Glasgow Warriors. He made his debut for the club on 30 August 2016 against Canada 'A' scoring a try, but was injured in the process. He made his Pro12 debut on 31 December 2016 for the Warriors against Benetton Treviso in Italy in a 35-28 win for the Glasgow side.

On 4 May 2017 it was announced that Kenatale would be released by the Glasgow Warriors at the end of the season.

International career

Nemia was also an understudy to Kelemedi Bola for the Knights during the Colonial Cup. He has since grown as a player and has twice represented his country; on 5 July 2008 against Tonga (Lost, 16–27) and on 22 June 2008 against Japan (Won, 24–12). In October 2010 Kenatale was selected to represent his country, for the upcoming Fiji 2010 November tour of Europe.

References

External links
Fiji Rugby Player Profile
Profile on Scrum.com
RWC Sevens 2009

1986 births
Living people
Fijian rugby union players
Rugby union scrum-halves
Fiji international rugby union players
Fijian expatriate rugby union players
Southland rugby union players
Fijian expatriate sportspeople in New Zealand
Expatriate rugby union players in New Zealand
Fijian expatriate sportspeople in Romania
Expatriate rugby union players in Romania
People from Tavua, Fiji
I-Taukei Fijian people
Glasgow Warriors players
Stirling County RFC players
People educated at Ratu Kadavulevu School